Nancy Archibald (7 December 1911 – 28 August 1996) was a Canadian fencer. She competed in the  women's individual foil event at the 1936 Summer Olympics. She was a sister of Joan Archibald and Griselda Archibald.

Married to Werner Joeck, they had four children, Nancy Traina, Susan Stewart (fencer), Ian Joeck, and Neil Joeck.

References

1911 births
1996 deaths
Canadian female fencers
Olympic fencers of Canada
Fencers at the 1936 Summer Olympics
Fencers from Montreal